In Your Direction is a Mickey Ratt live recording at the Cellar Garage in Culver City, CA in 1981.

Track list
 In Your Direction
 Rockin' For You
 Never Use Love
 Dr. Rock
 Cry In Time
 Ain't Gonna Be Your Fool
 Bad Reputation
 Fallen Angel
 Top Secret
 Your Only Age
 U Got It

Personnel
 Stephen Pearcy: Lead vocals
 Jake E. Lee: Lead guitar
 Bob DeLellis: Rhythm guitar, Backing vocals, Lead guitar on "Fallen Angel"
 Matt Thorr: Bass
 Dave Alford: Drums, Backing vocals

References

Ratt albums